Sir Ambrose Joseph McGonigal, MC (22 November 1917 – 22 September 1979) was a High Court Judge in Northern Ireland.

McGonigal was born in South Dublin in 1917, the son of son of John McGonigal KC, county court judge for Co. Tyrone (1939–43), and his wife Margaret Davoren, daughter of Richard Davoren, solicitor, of Friarsland, Roebuck, Co. Dublin.
He was educated at Clongowes Wood College and Queen's University Belfast.

He served with distinction in the British Army during the Second World War and was awarded the MC in 1944. In 1948 he was called to the Northern Ireland Bar and became a High Court judge on 8 March 1968. 
In 1975 McGonigal was appointed a Lord Justice of Appeal. He was knighted on 1 July 1975. 

He died in 1979, aged 62.

Justice McGonigal is mentioned in Tony Geraghty's The Irish War: the hidden conflict between the IRA and British Intelligence as having been "forced to carry a gun under his robe" due to terrorism in Northern Ireland, which would claim the lives of at least five judges or justices in Northern Ireland.

His son, Eoin McGonigal, SC, practises in Dublin, Ireland.

Torturers' Charter 

As a consequence of a report by Lord Diplock on legal procedures to deal with terrorist activities in Northern Island, Diplock courts were instated on which among others Lord Justice McGonigal presided. As part of his work there he made a ruling that came to be known as the ‘Torturters' Charter’: “In a famous, or infamous, ruling, Lord Justice McGonigal said that a ‘blow’ did not necessarily render a statement inadmissable.”

References

1917 births
1979 deaths
Members of the Privy Council of the United Kingdom
20th-century King's Counsel
High Court judges of Northern Ireland
Lords Justice of Appeal of Northern Ireland
Lawyers from Belfast
British Army personnel of World War II
British Army Commandos officers
Royal Ulster Rifles officers
Special Air Service officers
People educated at Clongowes Wood College
Lawyers from Dublin (city)
Place of death missing
20th-century British lawyers
Northern Ireland King's Counsel
Knights Bachelor